Minuscule 466 (in the Gregory-Aland numbering), α 167 (in the Soden numbering), is a Greek minuscule manuscript of the New Testament, on parchment. Palaeographically it has been assigned to the 11th century. The manuscript is lacunose. 
Formerly it was labeled by 115a and 135p.

Description 

The codex contains the text of the Acts of the Apostles, Catholic epistles, and Pauline epistles on 174 parchment leaves. It begins at Acts 14:27 and ends at 2 Timothy with some lacunae (1 Thess 5:17-28; 2 Thess 1:12-3:4; 1 Timothy 1:1-24; 2:15-3:3; 2 Timothy 2:21-4:22; Tit 2:15-3:15). It is written in one column per page, 27-28 lines per page.

It has not liturgical notes on the margin.

The order of books: Acts of the Apostles, Catholic epistles, and Pauline epistles.

According to the subscription at the end of the Epistle to the Romans, the Letter was written προς Ρωμαιους εγραφη απο Κορινθου δια Φοιβης της διακονου; the same subscription have manuscripts: 42, 90, 216, 339, 462, 642;

Text 

The Greek text of the codex is a representative of the Byzantine text-type. Aland placed it in Category V.

History 

The manuscript once belonged to Colbert's collection.

The manuscript was examined and described by Scholz (whole manuscript), Paulin Martin, and C. R. Gregory (1885).

It was added to the list of New Testament manuscripts by Scholz. Formerly it was labeled by 115a and 135p. In 1908 Gregory gave the number 466 to it.

It is currently housed at the Bibliothèque nationale de France (Gr. 58) in Paris.

See also 

 List of New Testament minuscules
 Biblical manuscript
 Textual criticism

References

Further reading

External links 
 

Greek New Testament minuscules
11th-century biblical manuscripts
Bibliothèque nationale de France collections